R. nivea may refer to:
 Raphitoma nivea, a sea snail species
 Rissoina nivea, a sea snail species
 Rocroithys nivea, a sea snail species

See also 
 Nivea (disambiguation)